City Stadium Gostivar is a multi-purpose stadium in Gostivar, North Macedonia.  It is currently used mostly for football matches and is currently the home stadium of FK Gostivar.  The stadium holds 1,000 people. As 2015, the stadium is at the undergoing renovation.

References

Football venues in North Macedonia
Gostivar
KF Gostivari